Torpsbruk is a locality situated in Alvesta Municipality, Kronoberg County, Sweden with 334 inhabitants in 2010.

References 

Populated places in Kronoberg County
Populated places in Alvesta Municipality
Värend